Military Ocean Terminal Sunny Point (MOTSU) is one of the largest military terminals in the world. It serves as a transfer point between rail, trucks, and ships for the import and export of weapons, ammunition, explosives and military equipment for the United States Army and is operated by the 596th Transportation Brigade.

Facility description
The terminal lies between the small town of Boiling Spring Lakes, North Carolina, and the Cape Fear River a few miles upstream of Fort Johnston (North Carolina) and the small city of Southport, North Carolina.  

An additional  was set aside on Pleasure Island (location of Carolina, Kure, and Fort Fisher beaches) as a buffer zone around the facility.

The terminal is not an open post and access is restricted. The wharfs are also restricted and not accessible to the public (no landing or docking).  The Cape Fear River directly in front of the wharfs is restricted and non-military traffic is restricted to transit only (no anchoring).

The port can handle up to 6 ships simultaneously and features large cranes for loading and unloading vessels.

History
The earliest known use of the area dates to 1725 when George Burrington operated a plantation following his first term as colonial governor of the then Province of North Carolina. It later was known as Snows Point when owned by rice planter Robert Snow. During the Civil War, the area hosted an artillery battery protecting the Cape Fear River. Its isolation, few structures and access to deep water made it an ideal location as an ammunition transfer point. Sunny Point military logistics center was built in 1951 and opened in 1955.

The port has transferred munitions to every major armed conflict since it was established. The facility was especially active during the Vietnam War with up to six ships being simultaneously loaded. 466,000 tons of cargo was transferred through MOTSU during the Persian Gulf War.

See also
 Surface Deployment and Distribution Command
 Military Ocean Terminal

References

External links
Military Ocean Terminal Sunny Point Brunswick County, NC

Buildings and structures in Brunswick County, North Carolina
Cape Fear (region)
Military installations in North Carolina
Transportation in Brunswick County, North Carolina